The Merionethshire Railway (MR) was a proposed  and  dual gauge railway in south Caernarfonshire (now part of Gwynedd) North Wales, United Kingdom. It was incorporated by an Act of Parliament on 29 June 1871. Powers to build the line lapsed in 1885 and were abandoned on 12 July 1887. Work to build the line never started, though parliamentary extensions of time to do so were obtained in 1876, 1879 and 1882.

Route

Gauges
The junction with the F&BR meant the MR would use the same gauge, which was formally , though the Act cited "2-foot gauge". This proposed line was to meet the narrow gauge F&BR at Llan Ffestiniog, so the MR's Act was updated to allow mixed gauge by laying a third rail.

Purposes
By proposing the line its backers sought to threaten the Festiniog Railway into reducing charges and raising service levels.

Actions
The Bala and Festiniog Railway (B&FR) reached Llan Ffestiniog in 1882 and converted the F&BR to standard gauge in 1883. This long, mountainous route of the B&FR posed little threat to the FR. Most of the slate traffic it did carry was taken to the FR at Blaenau Ffestiniog.

It then ran westerly, descending along the south side of the valley of the Afon Dwyryd running parallel to the course of the FR on the northern side of the valley.

See also
British narrow gauge railways

References

Sources

Further material

Statute Law Repeals: Nineteenth Report, Draft Statute Law (Repeals) Bill. Great Britain Law Commission, The Stationery Office, 2012, p. 272.

External links
The area the line would have crossed on Rail Map Online
Merionethshire Railway on Festipedia

Ffestiniog Railway
1 ft 11½ in gauge railways in Wales
Railway companies established in 1871
1871 establishments in Wales
Railway companies disestablished in 1887